Ayyappan Temple  is a Hindu Ayyappan Temple located in Siddhapudur in Coimbatore, India. It is dedicated to Ayyappan.

Presiding deity 

The presiding deity is known as Manikandan. As per the Kerala style, shrines of Ganesha, Bhagavati, Siva, Guruvayurappan and Muruga are found. The shrine of Navagraha is also found here. The devotees are extremely proud of the status of the temple as the Second Sabarimala. The poojas and other religious rituals are observed similar to the fashion in Sabarimala. Plans for the construction of a temple devoted to Lord Ayyappan started way back in 1942 with the coming together of a group of devotees. On 24 March 1969 Kumbhabhishekam was held and in 1972 a Dhwaja Stambha was set up and later was covered with gold. It is the only one of its kind in Tamil Nadu.

Festivals
Pradosha, Ekadashi, Karthikai and Sivaratri and the festivals celebrated in this temple.

Opening time
The temple is opened for worship from 5.00 a.m. to 10.30 a.m and 4.00 p.m. to 8.00 p.m.

References

External links
 சித்தாபுதூர் ஐயப்பன் கோயில், கோயம்புத்தூர், ஆன்மீகத் தகவல்கள், புதுயுகம் டிவி, 3 ஆகஸ்ட் 2017
 சித்தாபுதூர் ஐயப்பன் கோவிலில் மாலை அணிந்து விரதத்தை தொடங்கிய பக்தர்கள், நியூஸ்18, 17 நவம்பர் 2021
 ஐயப்பன் ஆறாட்டு, ஐயப்பன் கோயில், சித்தாபுதூர், கோவை, ஆலய மகிமை, 6 ஏப்ரல் 2022

Hindu temples in Coimbatore district
Tourist attractions in Coimbatore
Buildings and structures in Coimbatore